Novosilsky (masculine), Novosilskaya (feminine), or Novosilskoye (neuter) is the name of several rural localities in Russia:
Novosilskoye, Lipetsk Oblast, a selo in Novosilsky Selsoviet of Terbunsky District of Lipetsk Oblast
Novosilskoye, Voronezh Oblast, a selo in Novosilskoye Rural Settlement of Semiluksky District of Voronezh Oblast